David Lee Robinson Jr. (February 3, 1968 – September 30, 1995) was an American professional football defensive back who played in the National Football League (NFL), the World League of American Football (WLAF), and the Canadian Football League (CFL). He played for the New England Patriots and Detroit Lions of the NFL, the Sacramento Surge of the WLAF, and the Sacramento Gold Miners and Memphis Mad Dogs of the CFL. Robinson played collegiately at East Carolina University.

Early years and college career

Professional career
Robinson was selected by the New England Patriots in the fifth round (110th pick overall) of the 1990 NFL Draft. He signed with the team on July 19, 1990. During his rookie season, he appeared in all 16 regular season games and returned 11 kickoffs for 211 yards, averaging 19.2 yards per return. The Patriots released him in final roster cuts on August 26, 1991.

Death
Robinson died in a car accident on September 30, 1995.

References

1968 births
1995 deaths
American football cornerbacks
American players of Canadian football
Canadian football defensive backs
Detroit Lions players
East Carolina Pirates football players
Memphis Mad Dogs players
New England Patriots players
Sportspeople from High Point, North Carolina
Players of American football from North Carolina
Sacramento Gold Miners players
Sacramento Surge players
Road incident deaths in North Carolina